Playwutchyalike: The Best of Digital Underground is the second compilation album from rap group Digital Underground.

Track listing
"Same Song" (Edit)
"The Way We Swing"
"Underwater Rimes" (Remix)
"The Humpty Dance"
"Freaks of the Industry"
"Doowutchyalike"
"Sex Packets"
"Packet Man"
"Nuttin' Nis Funky"
"Heartbeat Props"
"No Nose Job"
"Kiss You Back"
"Wussup wit the Luv" (Single version)
"We Got More"

References

2003 compilation albums
Digital Underground albums